BU-LAD, also known as 6-butyl-6-nor-lysergic acid diethylamide, is an analogue of LSD first made by Alexander Shulgin and reported in the book TiHKAL. BU-LAD is a psychedelic drug similar to LSD, but is significantly less potent than LSD, with a dose of 500 micrograms producing only mild effects.

References

Lysergamides